Events in the year 1898 in Venezuela.

Incumbents
President: Joaquin Crespo until February 28, Ignacio Andrade

Events

Births

Deaths
April 16 - Joaquin Crespo

References

1890s in Venezuela